The Clark County Heritage Center is a Romanesque architecture-style building in central Springfield, Ohio, United States.  Originally built for the city's offices in 1890, it is now the location of the Clark County Historical Society (founded in 1897), which includes a museum, research library and archives.  The building has been listed on the National Register of Historic Places.

See also
National Register of Historic Places listings in Clark County, Ohio

References

External links

National Register of Historic Places in Clark County, Ohio
Government buildings on the National Register of Historic Places in Ohio
Buildings and structures in Springfield, Ohio
Clock towers in Ohio
Museums in Clark County, Ohio
History museums in Ohio